The keeled slug-eating snake (Pareas carinatus) is a species of snake in the family Pareidae . It is relatively widespread in Southeast Asia, from southern China (Yunnan) to Burma and Indochina to the Malay Archipelago (Borneo, Java, Lombok, Sumatra, Bali). Two subspecies are recognized: P. c. carinatus and P. c. unicolor, the latter being confined to Cambodia.

Keeled slug-eating snakes live in or near forests. They are nocturnal and mostly arboreal, and as the common name suggests, they feed exclusively on snails and slugs. They are oviparous.

While the species is negatively affected by forest destruction, IUCN considers these effects to be localized and not threatening the species.

Gallery

References

Pareas
Reptiles of Myanmar
Reptiles of Brunei
Reptiles of Cambodia
Reptiles of China
Reptiles of Indonesia
Reptiles of Laos
Reptiles of Malaysia
Reptiles of Thailand
Reptiles of Vietnam
Reptiles of Borneo
Fauna of Sumatra
Reptiles described in 1828
Snakes of China
Snakes of Vietnam
Snakes of Asia